The National Capital Territory of Delhi (NCT) is a special union territory of India jointly administered by the Central government, the NCT elected government and three municipal corporations. The metropolis of Delhi and the National Capital Territory of Delhi are coextensive and for most practical purposes they are considered to be the same entity.

Following is a list of towns recognized under the territory by census of India.

Source:

References

 
Delhi-related lists